Eagle's Claw is a yellow, brown and black KMG Afterburner amusement ride situated in Lightwater Valley, in Ripon, North Yorkshire, England. It is a thrill ride with a height restriction of 1.22 metres, and a capacity of 24 riders. The Keighley News wrote that it "feels like a scarier version of the old Viking longship."

Closing 
The Eagle's Claw was closed during July 2017, following a fatal accident on a similar ride in the US. It reopened the following month following safety checks.

The ride was confirmed to be leaving the park for the 2021 season due to a shift to the family market. Following the park's new ownership however, this decision appears to have been changed with the attraction set to operate for the 2022 season. The ride's height restriction has recently changed from 1.4m to 1.22m.

Theme 
Although this ride does not have a specific theme, it is dedicated to a bird called Wingnut at the Lightwater Valley Birds of Prey centre.

References

External links 
 The Eagle's Claw at lightwatervalley.co.uk

Amusement rides manufactured by KMG